Dato' Haji Rosol bin Wahid (Jawi: رسول بن واحد; born 10 July 1964) is a Malaysian politician who has served as the Member of Parliament (MP) for Hulu Terengganu since May 2018. He served as the Deputy Minister of Domestic Trade and Consumer Affairs for the second term in the Barisan Nasional (BN) administration under former Prime Minister Ismail Sabri Yaakob and former Minister Alexander Nanta Linggi from August 2021 to the collapse of the BN administration in November 2022 and the first term in the Perikatan Nasional (PN) administration under former Prime Minister Muhyiddin Yassin and former Minister Alexanderfrom March 2020 to the collapse of the PN administration in August 2021, Member of the Terengganu State Legislative Assembly (MLA) for Ajil from November 1999 to May 2013. He is a member of the Malaysian United Indigenous Party (BERSATU), a component party of the PN administration and was a member of the United Malays National Organisation (UMNO), a component party of the Barisan Nasional (BN) coalition. He resigned from UMNO in 2018 and joined BERSATU, a component party of the formerly the Pakatan Harapan (PH) and presently the PN coalitions in 2019.

Rosol was elected as assemblyman for Ajil in the 1999 state election, 2004 state election and 2008 state election, but did not re-contest his seat in the 2013 state election.

Election results

Honours
  :
  Knight Commander of the Order of the Crown of Terengganu (DPMT) – Dato' (2005)

See also

 Hulu Terengganu (federal constituency)

References 

1964 births
Living people
People from Terengganu
Malaysian people of Malay descent
Malaysian Muslims
Malaysian United Indigenous Party politicians
Former United Malays National Organisation politicians
Independent politicians in Malaysia
Members of the Dewan Rakyat
21st-century Malaysian politicians
20th-century Malaysian politicians
Knights Commander of the Order of the Crown of Terengganu